Karin Tietze is a retired East German slalom canoeist who competed in the mid-1950s. She won two medals at the 1955 ICF Canoe Slalom World Championships in Tacen with a gold in the folding K-1 team event and a silver in the folding K-1 event.

References

External links 
 Karin TIETZE at CanoeSlalom.net

East German female canoeists
Possibly living people
Year of birth missing (living people)
Medalists at the ICF Canoe Slalom World Championships